Zorothis is a genus of moths of the family Noctuidae. The genus was erected by Schaus in 1916.

Species
Zorothis dissimilis Schaus, 1916
Zorothis zacualpana Schaus, 1916

References

Herminiinae